The Sri Lankan national cricket team visited Pakistan in February to March 2000 and played a three-match Test series against the Pakistani national cricket team. Sri Lanka won the Test series 2–1. Sri Lanka were captained by Sanath Jayasuriya and Pakistan by Saeed Anwar or Moin Khan. In addition, the teams played a three-match Limited Overs International (LOI) series which Sri Lanka won 3–0.

ODI series

1st ODI

2nd ODI

3rd ODI

Test series summary

1st Test

2nd Test

3rd Test

References

External links

2000 in Pakistani cricket
2000 in Sri Lankan cricket
International cricket competitions from 1997–98 to 2000
Pakistani cricket seasons from 1970–71 to 1999–2000
1999-2000